The Corpse of Christ is a painting by the Italian Baroque master Annibale Carracci, dating to c. 1583-1585  and housed in the Staatsgalerie of Stuttgart, Germany.

The work, dating to Carracci's early career, is a manifest homage to Andrea Mantegna's Dead Christ, which he had perhaps seen in the Aldobrandini collection. Christ is portrayed lying in a contorted position, seen from his feet. Differently from Mantegna, Carracci did not paint the mourners at the side, and adopted a more realistic depiction of the body.

Sources

Paintings by Annibale Carracci
1580s paintings
Carracci